Aedes (Verrallina) seculatus is a species complex of zoophilic mosquito belonging to the genus Aedes. It is found in Sri Lanka.

References

seculatus
Insects described in 1950
Insects of Sri Lanka